Carterica mucronata is a species of beetle in the family Cerambycidae. It was described by Olivier in 1795. It is known from Bolivia, Brazil, French Guiana and Peru.

References

Colobotheini
Beetles described in 1795